Moraine Lake is located in North Cascades National Park, in the U. S. state of Washington. Moraine Lake is in a remote section of the park and well off any designated trails. During warmer months, melt from both the Inspiration and Forbidden Glaciers flow into Moraine Lake.

References

Lakes of Washington (state)
North Cascades National Park
Lakes of Skagit County, Washington